Francisco Javier Costilla Macedo (born December 3, 1974) is a Mexican luchador enmascarado, or masked professional wrestler, better known by his ring name Ramstein. He is working for the Mexican professional wrestling promotion Consejo Mundial de Lucha Libre (CMLL) portraying a rudo ("bad guy") wrestling character. He is a former member of the wrestling groups La Alianza and Pandilla Guerrera.

Professional wrestling career
Francisco Costilla began his wrestling career in 1993, working as the enmascarado (masked) character Fugaz, which is Spanish for "Fast", a reference to his high flying, fast paced wrestling style. At some point early in his career Costilla was forced to remove the Fugaz mask after losing a Luchas de Apuesta ("Bet Match") against Enemigo Publico. Later he lost another Luchas de Apuestas match, this time to Rayo Tapatío I, and as a result had to have his hair shaved.

In late 1998 or early 1999 he began working for Consejo Mundial de Lucha Libre (CMLL), one of Mexico's biggest and the world's oldest wrestling promotion. On July 16, 1999, Fugaz teamed up with Sangre Azteca to defeat the team of Sombra de Plata and Ricky Marvin in a match that stole the show, earning the four youngsters a standing ovation from the crowd. The success of this match earned all four a match at CMLL's biggest show of the year, the CMLL 66th Anniversary Show, which took place on September 24, 1999. This time Marvin and Sombra de Plata won the match.

Fugaz was teamed up with the veteran Scorpio, Jr. to participate in the 1999 Gran Alternativa tournament, where a rookie and a veteran team up. The tournament took place on December 17, 1999, and had the team advance to the finals by defeating the teams of Sombra de Plata and Lizmark and Negro Casas and La Flecha. In the finals they lost to El Felino and Tigre Blanco.

Costilla made his last CMLL appearance as "Fugaz" on July 9, 2001, teaming with former rival Enemigo Publico to defeat the team of Neutron and Olimpus.

Ramstein (2001–present)
Exactly two weeks after his final appearance as Fugaz, Costilla was reintroduced as the enmascrado character Ramstein (named after the band Rammstein), teaming up with Enemigo Public, losing to longtime rivals of Fugaz Los Rayos Tapatío. On July 30, 2001, Costilla made one last appearance as Fugaz, when lost another Luchas de Apuesta, this time to Damián 666, and was once again shaved bald following the match. In 2001 he teamed up with Sangre Azteca and Hooligan to form a rúdo (wrestlers who portray the "bad guys") group called La Alianza ("The Alliance"). La Alianza's lone highlight was their participation in a tournament for the vacant Mexican National Trios Championship in 2003, although they lost in the first round. In 2002 Ramstein and Sangre Azteca won the Distrito Federal Tag Team Championship and would hold the belts until 2004 when they lost them to Los Rayos Tapatío. La Alianza only worked one major CMLL show while they existed, teaming up to defeat Astro Boy, Neutron, and Zetta on the undercard of the 2004 Homenaje a Dos Leyendas ("Homage to two legends") show on March 19, 2004. CMLL created the Guapos University ("Handsome University"), or Guapos U, a storyline mimicking realities shows such as WWE Tough Enough, searching for a new member to join Shocker, Máscara Mágica, and El Terrible as part of Los Guapos. The contestants included, among others, Sangre Azteca who left La Alianza to compete in the "reality show". During one of CMLL's shows El Terrible turned on the group and was joined by Último Guerrero in the attack on Los Guapos. Sangre Azteca and El Koreano prevented the rest of the Guapos U class in making the save, leading to the two them being kicked out of the group. Guerrero immediately took both Sangre Azteca and Koreano under his wing, forming Pandilla Guerrera ("Gang of Warriors"), a mid-card group associated with Último Guerrero's Los Guerreros del Infierno group that also included the rest of La Alianza, Ramstein and Hooligan. Sangre Azteca would soon lead the group that besides Ramstein and Hooligan also included El Koreano, Nitro, Arkangel de la Muerte, Loco Max and Doctor X. In early 2005 Sangre Azteca, Doctor X and Nitro beat Safari, El Felino, and Volador Jr. Pandilla Guerra held the championship for 7 months and made three successful title defenses before they lost the championship to Máximo, El Texano, Jr., and El Sagrado. El Koreano did not stay with the group long, changing his ring name and adopting a mask as he began working as "Apocalipsis", with no reference to his previous character. Pandilla Guerrera remained solidly entrenched in the CMLL mid-card, working primarily with younger tecnicos (Spanish term for a wrestler who plays a "good guy" character), helping them gain experience in the ring. Over time Ramstein appeared less frequently with Pandilla Guerrera, and when Pandilla Guerrero was renamed Los Guerreros Tuareg he was not included in the new group. In the years following his split from Pandilla Guerrera Ramstein works primarily in the first or second match of the show. On January 6, 2015, Ramstein and Cholo were defeated in a Lucha de Apuestas by Soberano Jr. and Star, Jr. and were both forced to unmask.

Championships and accomplishments
Comisión de Box y Lucha Libre Mexico D.F.
Distrito Federal Tag Team Championship (1 time) – with Sangre Azteca

Luchas de Apuestas record

Footnotes

References

1974 births
Living people
Masked wrestlers
Mexican male professional wrestlers
Professional wrestlers from Mexico City